Virginia Ruano Pascual and Paola Suárez were the defending champions, and successfully defended their title, defeating Cara Black and Liezel Huber in the final 4–6, 6–3, 6–3 Cara Black would fail to complete the career grand slam in women's doubles because of this loss

Seeds

Draw

Finals

Top half

Section 1

Section 2

Bottom half

Section 3

Section 4

External links 
 Draw
2005 French Open – Women's draws and results at the International Tennis Federation

Women's doubles
French Open by year – Women's doubles
French Open – doubles
French Open – doubles